Rebecca Julia Shipley  is a British mathematician and professor of healthcare engineering at University College London (UCL). She is director of the UCL Institute of Healthcare Engineering, co-director of the UCL Centre for Nerve Engineering and Vice Dean (Health) for the UCL Faculty of Engineering Sciences. She is also co-director of the UCL CHIMERA Research Hub with Prof Christina Pagel and a Fellow of the Institution of Engineering and Technology.

Early life and education 
Shipley grew up in Buckinghamshire, where she attended Dr Challoner's High School for Girls. She graduated with an MMath in Mathematics from St Hugh's College, University of Oxford and was awarded a doctorate from the Oxford Centre for Industrial and Applied Mathematics, Mathematical Institute, University of Oxford in 2008 for her thesis "Multiscale Modelling of Fluid and Drug Transport in Vascular Tumours".

Research career 
Her first postdoctoral position was a prestigious Research Fellowship at Christ Church, Oxford to develop mathematical and computational models that describe biomechanical and biochemical stimulation of tissues. She also held two concurrent Visiting Research Fellowships at the Centre for Regenerative Medicine, Bath, and Tissue Repair and Engineering Centre, UCL during that time.

In 2012, Shipley moved from mathematics into bioengineering, taking up a Lectureship in UCL Mechanical Engineering. Her research is predominantly divided into two themes: tumour blood flow and nervous system tissue engineering.

Within the field of tumour blood flow and therapy prediction, she is developing new bioengineering platforms which combine computational modelling with in vivo and ex vivo imaging data to better understand and interrogate cancer therapies. Her work advancing cancer therapies has been recognised in the national press.

Within nervous system tissue engineering, she has developed an interdisciplinary programme spanning bioengineering, computational modelling and tissue engineering to characterise the response of repairing nerves to chemical and mechanical stimuli, and integrate these data to design and test repair constructs. This is complemented by her work using computational modelling to understand the role of biochemical and biophysical stimuli, and define operating parameters, in tissue engineering development.

In 2017 she co-founded the UCL Centre for Nerve Engineering, the first Centre in the UK to bring together engineering and physical sciences with the life and clinical sciences to tackle translational nerve engineering problem.

In March 2020, Shipley was one of the main leads of the UCL / UCL Hospitals / Mercedes F1 effort to develop, manufacture and distribute the Ventura non-invasive breathing mask to provide crucial machines to help patients during the COVID-19 pandemic. The design was made open source and to date over 1,800 teams from 105 countries have taken licences and 20 have manufactured their own prototypes to test.

Honours, awards and recognition 

 “Young Researcher of the Year” by the Tissue and Cell Engineering Society UK (TCES) in 2011
 Rosetrees Trust Interdisciplinary Prize 2016
5-year EPSRC Fellowship 2018-2023
 Associate editor for Nature Scientific Reports, Journal of Engineering Mathematics

Shipley was appointed Officer of the Order of the British Empire (OBE) in the 2021 Birthday Honours for services to the development of the Continuous Positive Airways Pressure Device during the pandemic.

Public outreach and engagement 
Shipley is active in bringing mathematics and engineering to the wider public. Her outreach activities include:

 Participating in a UK wide event, Tomorrow’s Engineers Week Big Assembly, in November 2019 to inspire young people to enter engineering careers
 Royal Society Summer Exhibition stall on the Mathematics of Cancer
 Podcasts for BBC Radio 2 (Naked Scientists)

References 

Year of birth missing (living people)
Living people
Alumni of St Hugh's College, Oxford
People from Buckinghamshire
British women mathematicians
British biochemists
British bioengineers
Academics of University College London
Fellows of the Institution of Engineering and Technology
Officers of the Order of the British Empire